State Route 8 (SR 8) is part of Maine's system of numbered state highways, running from U.S. Route 201 (US 201) at Memorial Circle in Augusta, to an intersection with US 201 in Solon.

SR 8 goes north from Augusta through the Belgrade Lakes region, running concurrently with Routes 11 and 27 to Belgrade. The road continues northeast from Belgrade to Norridgewock, where it intersects US 2. The route joins with US 201A and follows the Kennebec River through Madison and Anson to its north end at Solon.

Junction list

References

External links

Floodgap Roadgap's RoadsAroundME: Maine State Route 8

008
Transportation in Kennebec County, Maine
Transportation in Somerset County, Maine